Thorbjørn Kultorp (19 October 1929, in Skjeberg – 25 April 2004) was a Norwegian politician for the Labour Party.

He was elected to the Norwegian Parliament from Østfold in 1969, and was re-elected on two occasions.

On the local level he was a member of Skjeberg municipality council from 1959 to 1971, serving as deputy mayor in 1963–1967. From 1967 to 1971 he was also a member of Østfold county council.

References

1929 births
2004 deaths
Members of the Storting
Labour Party (Norway) politicians
Østfold politicians
20th-century Norwegian politicians